is a terminal underground metro station on the Sendai Subway Nanboku Line in Izumi-ku, Sendai, Miyagi Prefecture, Japan. In 2023, the sub-station has named Vegalta Sendai·Yursta-mae. In addition to being the northernmost subway station on the line, there is a large bus terminal for commuters to continue on towards the farthest reaches of Sendai, as well as neighboring towns such as Rifu and Tomiya.The area around Izumi-Chūō Station is highly commercial, with many shops, restaurants, night clubs, and other amenities.

Due to traffic congestion near the only exit of the original station, the city undertook a construction project to extend the underground passageway to an area which could facilitate more vehicles. That project was finished in 2005.

Lines

Station layout
Izumi-Chūō Station is an underground station with a single island platform serving two tracks.

Platforms

History
Izumi-Chūō Station was opened on July 15, 1992. On December 1, 2004 the first phase of expansion (second ticket gate, north entrance) was completed and on April 1, 2005 the northern expansion is completed, with underground passageways to Izumity 21 and the Izumi ward office. Operations were temporarily halted from March 11 to April 29, 2011 due to the effects of the 2011 Tōhoku earthquake and tsunami.

Passenger statistics
In fiscal 2015, the station was used by an average of 25,102 passengers daily.

Surrounding area

Izumi Ward Office
Izumi Police Station
Sendai City Izumi Library
Sendai Children's Space Center
Izumity 21
Sendai Stadium
Nanakita Park

References

External links

Railway stations in Sendai
Sendai Subway Namboku Line
Railway stations in Japan opened in 1992